Bitter Truth or similar, may mean:
 The Bitter Truth (film), 1917 film
 The Bitter Truth, 2021 album by Evanescence
 A Bitter Truth, 2011 novel by Caroline and Charles Todd
 "Bitter Truth", 2013 song by Hatebreed from The Divinity of Purpose
 "Bitter Truth", 1991 song by St Vitus from Heavier Than Thou
 "Bitter Truth", 1980 song by female post-punk band Mo-dettes
 "Bitter Truth", 2017 song by singer Iron & Wine from Beast Epic
 "Verdad amarga" (aka "Bitter Truth"), 1947 song by Consuelo Velázquez
 The Bitters Truth (also 'The Bitter Truth'), a brand of bitters from Boker's Bitters

See also

 Sugar: The Bitter Truth, a 2009 medical lecture by Robert Lustig
 "Truth, Bitter Truth", 2004 episode of One Tree Hill; see List of One Tree Hill episodes
 

 Bitter (disambiguation)
 Truth (disambiguation)